Péter Rózsás is a male former international table tennis player from Hungary.

Table tennis career
He won a bronze medal in the Swaythling Cup (team event) at the 1961 World Table Tennis Championships for Hungary with Zoltán Berczik, László Földy, Miklós Péterfy and Ferenc Sidó.

He also won three European Table Tennis Championships medals including two golds and two English Open titles.

See also
 List of table tennis players
 List of World Table Tennis Championships medalists

References

Hungarian male table tennis players
Table tennis players from Budapest
World Table Tennis Championships medalists
1943 births
Living people